"Tomorrow Never Knows" is the sixth single released by Mr. Children on November 10, 1994. The single sold 2.766 million copies and is the eighth-highest-selling single in Japan in the Oricon history.

Overview
"Tomorrow Never Knows" was Mr. Children's second No. 1 single on the Oricon Japanese charts and sold 2,766,290 copies during its run on the chart. The title track was used as the theme song to the Japanese drama  and was also included in the Mr. Children live album 1/42 released on September 8, 1999, and also Mr. Children 1992–1995, released on July 11, 2001. "Tomorrow Never Knows" was also included on Mr. Children's sixth album, Bolero, released on March 5, 1997, as a remix. While the track was noted as a remix, the only thing remixed was drummer Hideya Suzuki re-recording his drumming. On the March 16, 2007 episode of the Japanese music TV show Music Station, Mr. Children also mentioned the song was written while the group was on their Innocent World Tour. The b-side "" was included in Mr. Children's fourth album, Atomic Heart, released on September 1, 1994.

Awards and recognition
"Tomorrow Never Knows" has won many awards including 'Best Theme Song' at the 3rd Annual Television Drama Academy Awards, the 'Grand Prix Single Award' at the 9th Annual Japan Gold Disc Awards, and 'Best 5 Single Award' at the 9th Annual Japan Gold Disc Awards. "Tomorrow Never Knows" was also voted in 2006 as fans' No. 1 all-time favorite song on Music Station and was listed as the third-highest-selling drama tie-in single in Japan.

Track listing

Personnel
 Kazutoshi Sakurai – vocals, guitar
 Kenichi Tahara – guitar
 Keisuke Nakagawa – bass
 Hideya Suzuki – drums

Production
 Producer – Kobayashi Takeshi
 Arrangement - Mr. Children and Takeshi Kobayashi

See also
 Great Ocean Road

References

1994 singles
Oricon Weekly number-one singles
Mr. Children songs
Japanese television drama theme songs
Songs written by Kazutoshi Sakurai
1994 songs
Toy's Factory singles
Song recordings produced by Takeshi Kobayashi